Galina Yermolayeva may refer to:
Galina Yermolayeva (cyclist) (born 1937), Soviet cyclist
Galina Yermolayeva (rower) (born 1948), Soviet rower